A Web cache (or HTTP cache) is a system for optimizing the World Wide Web. It is implemented both client-side and server-side. The caching of multimedias and other files can result in less overall delay when browsing the Web.

Parts of the system

Forward and reverse
A forward cache is a cache outside the web server's network, e.g. in the client's web browser, in an ISP, or within a corporate network. A network-aware forward cache only caches heavily accessed items. A proxy server sitting between the client and web server can evaluate HTTP headers and choose whether to store web content.

A reverse cache sits in front of one or more web servers, accelerating requests from the Internet and reducing peak server load. This is usually a content delivery network (CDN) that retains copies of web content at various points throughout a network.

HTTP options
The Hypertext Transfer Protocol (HTTP) defines three basic mechanisms for controlling caches: freshness, validation, and invalidation. This is specified in the header of HTTP response messages from the server.

Freshness allows a response to be used without re-checking it on the origin server, and can be controlled by both the server and the client. For example, the Expires response header gives a date when the document becomes stale, and the Cache-Control: max-age directive tells the cache how many seconds the response is fresh for.

Validation can be used to check whether a cached response is still good after it becomes stale. For example, if the response has a Last-Modified header, a cache can make a conditional request using the If-Modified-Since header to see if it has changed. The ETag (entity tag) mechanism also allows for both strong and weak validation.

Invalidation is usually a side effect of another request that passes through the cache. For example, if a URL associated with a cached response subsequently gets a POST, PUT or DELETE request, the cached response will be invalidated.
Many CDNs and manufacturers of network equipment have replaced this standard HTTP cache control with dynamic caching.

Legality
In 1998, the DMCA added rules to the United States Code (17 U.S.C. §: 512) that exempts system operators from copyright liability for the purposes of caching.

Server-side software
This is a list of server-side web caching software.

See also 
 InterPlanetary File System - makes web caches redundant
 Cache Discovery Protocol
 Cache manifest in HTML5
 Content delivery network
 Harvest project
 Proxy server
 Web accelerator
Search engine cache

References

Further reading
 Ari Luotonen, Web Proxy Servers (Prentice Hall, 1997) 
 Duane Wessels, Web Caching (O'Reilly and Associates, 2001). 
 Michael Rabinovich and Oliver Spatschak, Web Caching and Replication (Addison Wesley, 2001). 

Hypertext Transfer Protocol
Cache (computing)

Web caching protocol